Laurel School is a private school for girls in Shaker Heights, Ohio, United States. It was established in 1896 by Jennie Prentiss and operates on two campuses; the Lyman Campus in Shaker Heights and the Butler Campus in Novelty.

Notable alumnae 
 Natalie Babbitt, author and illustrator
 Tamara Broderick, mathematician and computer scientist
 Kay Chorao, artist, illustrator, and writer
 Christine Chubbuck, television journalist
 Amanda Cinalli, professional soccer player
 Constance Coleman Richardson, painter
 Donna Ferrato, photojournalist and activist
 Marcia Gygli King, artist
 Jean Harris, convicted murderer and former head of the Madeira School
 Josephine Herrick, photographer, humanitarian, entrepreneur, and teacher
 Marne Levine, businesswoman
 Katharine Lee Reid, art historian
 Mary Ellen Wohl, physician and clinical researcher
 Dare Wright, children's author, model, and photographer

References

External links 

 

Shaker Heights, Ohio
Private elementary schools in Ohio
Private middle schools in Ohio
Private high schools in Ohio
Private K-12 schools in the United States
Girls' schools in Ohio
High schools in Cuyahoga County, Ohio
National Association of Independent Schools
Educational institutions established in 1896
1896 establishments in Ohio